Mark Wayne Hateley (born 7 November 1961) is an English former professional footballer who played as a striker. He started his career with Coventry City F.C. in the First Division of English football. A spell followed at English Second Division club Portsmouth, where he ended the 1983–84 season as the club's top goalscorer. He then moved to Italian club A.C. Milan, where he suffered several injuries (requiring four operations); however, he did score the winning goal against city rivals Inter Milan in 1984. In 1987, Hateley signed for French club Monaco, winning Ligue 1 in his first season at the Monegasque club. In 1990, he signed for Scottish Premier Division club Rangers. In his five-year spell in Glasgow, he was a part of a title-winning squad in every season, and he attained personal success in the 1993–94 season, as he was voted both the SFWA Footballer of the Year and the SPFA Players' Player of the Year, as well as the league's top goalscorer with 22 goals. He briefly rejoined the club in 1997, as there were no available forwards for the Old Firm match, but was sent off on his second debut. In 1999, Hateley was named as part of Rangers' greatest-ever team, and in 2003 he was inducted to Rangers' Hall of Fame.

From 1984 to 1992, Hateley made 32 appearances for the England national team, scoring nine goals. He was a member of the squads for the 1986 FIFA World Cup and UEFA Euro 1988.

Early life
Hateley was born in Derby on 7 November 1961. His father, Tony, was also a professional footballer who played as a striker for such clubs as Notts County, Aston Villa, Coventry City and Chelsea.

Club career
Hateley trained with Nottingham Forest whilst still at school; however, he was rejected by then-manager Brian Clough, who did not believe he was sufficiently talented. Upon leaving school, he joined Coventry City and started his career in professional football, playing over 90 games in the First Division before moving to Portsmouth in the Second Division in the summer of 1983. He scored 22 league goals for them in the 1983–84 season.

On 28 June 1984, he was transferred to A.C. Milan for £1 million. He scored a decisive and historic match-winning goal in a 2–1 win against Inter in the Milan Derby on 28 October 1984, beating out former Milan defender Fulvio Collovati with a header; this was the first time Milan had beaten Inter in the Derby in six years. Ayrton Senna lived in the apartment below him, and Boris Becker lived next door, during part of his time in Milan. Senna played five-a-side football with Hateley.

Arsène Wenger then brought him to AS Monaco, his first signing for the club, in 1987 and he was part of the team which won the French Division 1 title in 1987–88.

After three years at Monaco, a 28-year-old Hateley returned to Britain in a £1 million move to Rangers on 19 July 1990, taking an 80% reduction compared to his pay at Milan. Manager Graeme Souness had attempted to bring him to Ibrox three years earlier from Milan. Hateley became a key part of the Rangers side, and was voted player of the year by the Scottish Football Writers in 1993–94. He scored 112 goals for the Gers in all competitions, including two that clinched the championship on the final day in 1991 and one in each of the narrow Scottish Cup final victories in 1992 and 1993. Rangers were league champions in every season that Hateley played for them (scoring 85 Scottish Premier Division goals in the process), as they went on a run of nine successive titles, which lasted from 1989 until 1997.

As for Hateley's renowned strike partnership at Rangers with Ally McCoist, Hateley said: "Alistair was the perfect partner for me. As a finisher, he was an unbelievable goal scorer. He linked with me. All the goal scorer does is he looks at the leader of the line and makes sure he's offset, fifteen yards away. It was a great partnership" In 1992–93, Rangers scored 97 goals. McCoist won the European Golden Boot, with 49 of them, and Hateley scored 29.

After making 218 appearances for Rangers, he moved to Queens Park Rangers in November 1995, for a fee of £1.5 million. He had just recovered from having concurrent operations on his knee and ankle. Hateley said in 2021: "My dad always said to never make a decision when injured, or in ill-health, because invariably it will be the wrong decision, an emotional decision. I knew after literally ten days that it was the wrong move."

In early 1997, with Rangers trying to win their ninth title in a row and with a long injury list, manager Walter Smith desperately needed a striker, and re-signed Hateley for £300,000 to play in the vital game against Rangers' biggest rivals Celtic. Rangers won the game 1–0, but Hateley was sent off for headbutting Stewart Kerr. He played four times in his second spell at Rangers, scoring once, and transferred to Hull City in July 1997, where he fulfilled the role of player-manager. Hateley managed Hull from the summer of 1997 until November 1998.

Hateley ended his playing career with Ross County in September 1999, playing two games for them. "It was a great time. I really did enjoy myself up there. It was a logistic nightmare for me, because I was staying down in Derby and going through a divorce. I was having to fly from East Midlands into Glasgow and then I had twenty minutes to make a connection to get up there, and I could never make it."

International career
On 2 June 1984, Hateley was capped for England at senior level for the first time in a 2–0 friendly defeat to the USSR. In his next game, eight days later, he scored in a 2–0 victory over Brazil, to date England's only away victory against Brazil. By the end of 1984, he had been capped six times by England and scored three goals. He played a significant role in England's successful qualifying campaign for the 1986 World Cup, scoring important goals against Finland and Northern Ireland. However England started slowly in the tournament itself and after two disappointing results (a defeat against Portugal and a draw against Morocco), Hateley was among players dropped, being replaced by Peter Beardsley. England won their next match against Poland and Hateley thereafter fell out of favour.  He made the last of his 32 appearances in a 2–2 friendly draw with Czechoslovakia in 1992.

Style of play
A traditional target man, Hateley was a physical centre-forward who was known in particular for his strength in the air and ability to score goals with his head.

Personal life
Hateley has four children: Emma, Lucy, Faye and Tom. Tom, who was born in Monaco during father's spell at AS Monaco, is also a footballer. He is once divorced.

Paul Gascoigne lived with Hateley for two weeks after signing for Rangers in July 1995 for a club-record £4.3 million.

In 2021, Hateley released his autobiography Hitting the Mark: My Story.

Career statistics

Club

International

Honours
Monaco
Ligue 1: 1987–88

Rangers
Scottish Premier League: 1990–91, 1991–92, 1992–93, 1993–94, 1994–95, 1996–97
Scottish Cup: 1991–92, 1992–93
Scottish League Cup: 1990, 1992, 1993

England under-21
European Under-21 Football Championship: 1982, 1984

Individual
SFWA Footballer of the Year: 1993–94
SPFA Players' Player of the Year: 1993–94
UEFA European Under-21 Football Championship Golden Player: 1984
Ballon d'Or: 1987 (14th), 1985 (29th), 1984 (22nd)

References

External links

English footballers
England international footballers
1986 FIFA World Cup players
UEFA Euro 1988 players
England under-21 international footballers
Premier League players
English Football League players
English expatriate footballers
Serie A players
Expatriate footballers in Italy
Ligue 1 players
Expatriate footballers in Monaco
Scottish Football League players
North American Soccer League (1968–1984) players
Expatriate soccer players in the United States
A.C. Milan players
AS Monaco FC players
Coventry City F.C. players
Detroit Express players
Hull City A.F.C. players
Leeds United F.C. players
Portsmouth F.C. players
Queens Park Rangers F.C. players
Rangers F.C. players
Ross County F.C. players
English football managers
English Football League managers
Hull City A.F.C. managers
1961 births
Living people
English expatriate sportspeople in Monaco
Scottish league football top scorers
Association football forwards
Footballers from Derby
English expatriate sportspeople in the United States
Association football player-managers